The men's decathlon event at the 1948 Olympic Games took place between August 5 & August 6.  17-year-old Bob Mathias of the United States won with a points total of 7139.

Competition format
The decathlon consists of ten track and field events, with a points system that awards higher scores for better results in each of the ten components. The athletes all compete in one competition with no elimination rounds.

Schedule
All times are British Summer Time (UTC+1)

Records
Prior to the competition, the existing World and Olympic records were as follows.

Overall results
Key

References

External links
Organising Committee for the XIV Olympiad, The (1948). The Official Report of the Organising Committee for the XIV Olympiad. LA84 Foundation. Retrieved 5 September 2016.

Men's decathlon
1948
Men's events at the 1948 Summer Olympics